Imagination Lady is the fifth studio album by the blues band Chicken Shack, released in 1972 on the Deram record label. It was reissued by Esoteric Recordings in July 2012 on CD in the UK.

Track listing
All tracks composed by Stan Webb except where indicated:

Side one
"Crying Won't Help You Now" – 5:10 (Hudson Whittaker)
"Daughter of the Hillside" – 3:53
"If I Were a Carpenter" – 6:35 (Tim Hardin)
"Going Down" – 3:33 (Don Nix)

Side two
"Poor Boy" – 5:11
"Telling Your Fortune" – 11:11
"The Loser" – 2:32

Personnel

Chicken Shack
Stan Webb – guitar, vocals
John Glascock – bass guitar
Paul Hancox – drums

Production
Producer – Neil Slaven
Engineer – George Chkiantz
Studio – Olympic Studios
Cover painting – David Anstey
Inside Photography – Brian Ward

References

1972 albums
Chicken Shack albums
Deram Records albums
albums recorded at Olympic Sound Studios